Luis Perezagua (born 8 October 1949) is a Spanish actor of theater, cinema and television.

Biography 
Perezagua studied theater at The Royal High School of Dramatic Arts in Madrid. He began his professional career in Antonio Buero Vallejo's play "La Detonación" directed by José Tamayo.  At that time he had previously participated in independent theater groups with plays by playwrights such as Max Aub and Fernando Arrabal.  From then on, his professional career was mainly linked to the world of theater (The Zarzuela and Spanish Variety Shows).  At that time he alternated his professional activities with work in the cinema and television, and most recently, as an actor and speaker at the Complutense University of Madrid.

He has been a member of the CNINAT (National Center for the Initiation of Children and Adolescents to the Theater), directed by José María Morera, intervening in several of its productions.

Theater 
Throughout his career as an actor, he has been part of several theater and zarzuela companies, such as The Spanish Company of Classical Theater (directed by Manuel Canseco), The Small Theater Company of Madrid (directed by Antonio Guirau), The National Lyrical Company, The Ases Líricos Company (directed by Evelio Esteve) and the Isaac Albéniz Company (directed by Angel F. Montesinos). While in these companies, he performed mainly in popular plays from the Spanish Golden Age, even receiving the prize for Best Actor in the "Theater Festival of The Spanish Golden Age", celebrated in the Chamizal National Memorial (United States) with the play "La dama duende", in 1986. He performed as a comic tenor with the Ases Líricos Company and Isaac Albéniz Company in many well-known zarzuelas including, La del manojo de rosas, La calesera, Doña Francisquita, La corte de faraón, La verbena de la paloma, etc., as well as in their variety shows, Las leandras, La blanca doble and La bruja (As Tomillo). This last play was represented in honor of the one-hundredth year after the death of Gayarre, and was directed by Ignacio Aranaz.

In 1993 he starred with Lina Morgan in Celeste no es un color, and was directed by prestigious directors such as Josep María Mestre, Carles Alfaro, Francisco Nieva, Víctor Andrés Catena, José Luis García Sánchez, José Osuna, Evelio Esteve, Ángel F. Montesinos, Ignacio Aranaz, Gerardo Malla, Andrés Lima, José Tamayo, Alberto González Vergel, Carlos Larrañaga, Juan José Alonso Millán, Antonio Guirau, Mara Recatero, Luis Balaguer, Luis Iturri, Emilio Sagi, José Luis Alonso, Manuel Canseco, Ramón Ballesteros, Juan Carlos Pérez de la Fuente and Lluís Pascual, among others.  He has performed in many different play genres throughout his career.

Cinema 
He debuted with the short film Eres mi gula (starring with Isabel Ordaz), and later, he performed supporting roles in several films. His most prominent role in his early years as supporting actor was in the film Amanece que no es poco, directed by José Luis Cuerda in 1988. Later, he played as a supporting actor in several films directed by Fernando Fernán Gómez, such as Out of play in 1991, The woman of your life in 1994 and Nightmare for a rich man, in 1996.

In 1995 he performed as a supporting actor in 2 films nominated for the Goya Awards, Nobody will talk about us when we have died and Así en el cielo como en la tierra. He has also performed in Love Can Seriously Damage Your Health, and since the year 2000, he worked under the command of José Luis García Sánchez in films such as Adiós con el corazón, The Green March and Franky Banderas.

His most recent work is in the new film by José Luis Cuerda, Tiempo después, which was released at the end of 2018.

Television 
His first work in television was in 1980, in children's shows such as La cometa blanca and music programs such as A uan ba buluba balam bambum (1985).

Between 1984 and 1988, he was the voice of Maese Camera in La bola de cristal.  Later, he intervened in series such as Sesame Street, Detrás de la puerta and Los mundos de Yupi, where he was an important character. From the end of the 1980s until now, he has performed in numerous supporting roles in several television series such as Brigada Central, Hostal Royal Manzanares, ¡Ay Señor, Señor!, Los ladrones van a la oficina, Cuéntame como pasó, Velvet Colección, and many more.
He starred in the series Turno de Oficio: Diez años después (where he played Borja); Compuesta y sin novio (as Martinez); Los negocios de mamá (as Estanislao), Señor Alcalde (as Benito), and recently, in the first three seasons of Amar en tiempos revueltos, where he played the character which would make him quite famous, Isidro Bulnes.

He has performed as a supporting character in mini-series such as La Regenta (Fernando Méndez Leite), Don Quijote of Miguel de Cervantes (Manuel Gutiérrez Aragón), Entre naranjos (Josefina Molina), La banda de Pérez (Ricardo Palacios), and Martes de Carnaval (José Luis García Sánchez), among others.

Theater

Small Theater Company of Madrid

Dramatized readings

Zarzuela

The National Lyrical Company

The Ases Líricos and Isaac Albéniz Company

Television

Drama

Sitcom

Telefilms

Television Drama and Spanish Revue

Children and Teen's Show

Cinema

Films

Short films

References

External links 
 IMDb Database
 Luis Perezagua. Youtube channel
 Luis Perezagua. Vimeo channel
 Database of Academy of Escenic Arts of Spain
 Let's Work Together Database

1949 births
Living people
Spanish male television actors
Spanish male film actors
Spanish male stage actors
20th-century Spanish male actors
21st-century Spanish male actors
Male actors from Madrid